...And They Shall Take Up Serpents is the second studio album by American heavy metal band Byzantine. It was released on July 12, 2005.

Track listing

Personnel 
Chris "OJ" Ojeda – vocals, guitars, piano
Tony Rohbrough – guitars, bass
Matt Wolfe – drums, acoustic guitar
Drew Mazurek – mixing
Aaron Fisher – production

Singles 
 "Jeremiad"

References 

Byzantine (band) albums
Prosthetic Records albums
2005 albums